The Tom Ridge Environmental Center is a center on the grounds of Presque Isle State Park in Erie, Pennsylvania. Named after former Pennsylvania Governor and former U.S. Department of Homeland Security Director Tom Ridge, the center opened on 26 May 2006. The center has  of space including interpretive exhibits highlighting local and regional flora and fauna, as well as information on the human history and culture of the area. The center also has a large-format movie theater, a gift shop, a cafe, a visitors center, and an observation tower of   that overlooks Lake Erie and Waldameer Park and Water World. The facility also has five conference rooms and eight laboratories for environmental education and research of supporting organizations, plus the administrative offices of several environmental and conservation groups and agencies.

The center was designed by Wallace, Roberts & Todd Architects, and received the 2007 American Society of Landscape Architects President's Award for design-build projects in Delaware and Pennsylvania.

The parking lot in front of the facility was previously occupied by a drive-in theater, the Peninsula, which opened in 1969 and closed in 2001 (five years before the environmental center opened)

History

External links
Website
PA DCNR Website

References 

Tom Ridge Environmental Center
Natural history museums in Pennsylvania
Nature centers in Pennsylvania
Protected areas of Erie County, Pennsylvania